Sportsko društvo Vojvodina, commonly abbreviated as SD Vojvodina, formed in 1914, is a multi-sport club in Novi Sad, Serbia.

Clubs

Athletics

Basketball

Men's

Women's

National Championships – 2

Yugoslav Women's Basketball League:
Winners (2) : 1969, 1970
Runners-up (2) : 1972, 1992
First Women's Basketball League of Serbia:
Runners-up (4) : 2004, 2005, 2006, 2015

National Cups – 1

Yugoslav Women's Basketball Cup:
Runners-up (2) : 1972
Milan Ciga Vasojević Cup:
Winners (2) : 2001, 2015
Runners-up (6) : 1995, 1998, 1999, 2005, 2006, 2007

International titles – 0

Adriatic League Women:
Runners-up (1) : 2006

Football

Men's

Honours
National Championships - 2

Yugoslavian First League
 Winners (2): 1966, 1989
 Runners-up (3): 1957, 1962, 1975
Third place(1): 1992
Serbia and Montenegro First League
Third place(5): 1993, 1994, 1995, 1996, 1997
Serbian SuperLiga
 Runners-up (1): 2009
Third place(5): 2007, 2008, 2011, 2012, 2013

National Cups

Yugoslav Cup
 Runners-up (1): 1951
Serbia and Montenegro Cup
 Runners-up (1): 1997
Serbian Cup
 Winners (2): 2014, 2020
 Runners-up (4): 2007, 2010, 2011, 2013

International
European Cup/UEFA Champions League
 1/4 Finalists (1): 1967
Inter-Cities Fairs Cup/UEFA Cup/UEFA Europa League
 1/4 Finalists (2): 1962, 1968
Mitropa Cup
 Winners (1): 1977
 Runners-up (1): 1957
UEFA Intertoto Cup
 Winners (1): 1976
 Runners-up (1): 1998

Women's

Handball

Men's

Honours
 National League
Winners (8): 2005, 2013, 2014, 2015, 2016, 2017,2018,2019

 National Cup
Winners (6): 2005, 2006, 2011, 2015, 2019, 2020

 National Super Cup
Winners (6):  2013, 2014, 2015, 2016, 2018, 2019

 All Serbian Cup
 Winners (4): 2014/15, 2015/16, 2016/17, 2019/20

Women's

Ice hockey club

Honours
Serbian Hockey League:
Winners (7) : 1998, 1999, 2000, 2001, 2002, 2003, 2004
 Serbian Ice Hockey Cup
 Winners (3): 1999, 2000, 2001
Panonian League:
Winners (1) : 2009

Judo

Karate

Rugby

Swimming
National Championships
 Winners (1): 2005

Tennis

Volleyball

Men's

Honours
National Championships - 18
Champion of Yugoslavia (2):
1987-88, 1988–89
Champion of Serbia and Montenegro (10):
1991-92, 1992–93, 1993–94, 1994–95, 1995–96, 1996–97, 1997–98, 1998–99, 1999-00, 2003–04
Champion of Serbia (6):
2006-07, 2016-17, 2017-18, 2018-19, 2019-20, 2020-21

National Cups - 15
Yugoslav Cup (2):
1976-77, 1986–87
Serbia and Montenegro Cup (8):
1992-93, 1994–95, 1995–96, 1996–97, 1998–99, 2003–04, 2004–05, 2005-06
Serbian cup (5):
2006-07, 2009–10, 2011–12, 2014-15, 2019-20

 Serbia and Montenegro Super cup (1):
 1993
 Serbian Super cup (3):
 2015, 2019, 2020

International
CEV Champions League:
Semi finalist (2): 1988/89, 1995/96
CEV Cup:
Semi finalist (2): 1982/83, 2005/06
CEV Challenge Cup:
Winners (1): 2014/15

Women's

Water polo

Men's

Serbian League
Runners-up (3): 2009, 2010, 2011
Serbian Cup
Runners-up (3): 2009, 2010, 2011

Women's

 Serbian Cup
 Winners (1): 2020

Wrestling

 
Sport in Novi Sad
Multi-sport clubs in Serbia